Olga Boznańska (15 April 1865 – 26 October 1940) was a Polish painter of the turn of the 20th century. She was a notable painter in Poland and Europe, and was stylistically associated with the French impressionism, though she rejected this label.

Early life 
Boznańska was born in Kraków during foreign partitions of Poland. She was the daughter of Adam Nowina Boznański, (from a noble Polish family but influenced by positivism to take up work as a railway engineer) and Eugénie née Mondan originally from Valence, France.

Education and artistic training 
Boznańska learned drawing first from her mother who was a teacher in the convent school of Premonstratensians in Imbramowice near Kraków, then with Józef Siedlecki, Kazimierz Pochwalski and Antoni Piotrowski between 1883-6. She then studied at the Adrian Baraniecki School for Women. She débuted in 1886 at the Kraków Association of Friends of Fine Arts exhibition.

From 1886–1890 she studied art in the private schools of Karl Kricheldorf and Wilhelm Dürr in Munich - as women were not yet permitted at the Munich Academy.

Career 
From then on she devoted herself mostly to portraits, still lifes and occasionally landscapes. She became well connected within the Polish artistic community of Munich, notably Józef Brandt who became her mentor. Her 1893 Portrait of Paul Nauen obtained her first public success - being awarded the gold medal at the International Exhibition in Vienna the following year.

In 1898, she joined the Society of Polish Artists "Sztuka" and in the same year moved to Paris, where she became a member of the Société Nationale des Beaux-Arts and started teaching at the Académie de la Grande Chaumière and joined the Polish Society of Literature and Art (Polskie Towarzystwo Literacko-Artystyczne).

Her most famous 1894 portrait of an unknown child Girl with Chrysanthemums fascinated her contemporaries by its symbolist atmosphere and psychological insight. Boznańska received the French Legion of Honour in 1912, the Golden Laurel of the Polish Academy of Literature in 1936, the Grand Prix at the Exposition Internationale des Arts et Techniques la Vie Moderne in 1937, and the Order of Polonia Restituta in 1938. The same year, at the Venice Biennale, one of her portraits was purchased by King of Italy Victor Emmanuel III. Her paintings can be found in the National Museums in Wrocław, Kraków, Poznań and Warsaw as well as Musée d'Orsay in Paris and Ca' Pesaro – International Gallery of Modern Art in Venice.

She died in Paris at the age of 75.

Gallery

See also 
Culture of Poland
List of Polish painters

References

External links 

 Paweł Czopiński,  Inspiracje sztuką Japonii w malarstwie Olgi Boznańskiej. Muzeum Okręgowe W Toruniu, 2008.
 More paintings by Olga Boznańska
 Numerous paintings by Olga Boznańska including Girl with Chrysanthemums
 Boznańska, Olga at WIEM encyklopedia
 Profile of Olga Boznańska  at Culture.pl
Chronological list of paintings by Olga Boznańska

1865 births
1940 deaths
19th-century Polish painters
20th-century Polish painters
20th-century Polish women artists
19th-century Polish women artists
Recipients of the Legion of Honour
Recipients of the Order of Polonia Restituta
Polish women painters
Artists from Kraków
Golden Laurel of the Polish Academy of Literature